Rogiera gratissima (syn. Rondeletia gratissima Hemsl.) is an ornamental plant in the family Rubiaceae.

References

 

Guettardeae